The Serie A1 di pallamanno femminile is the premier division of the Italian women's handball national league. Established in 1970, it is currently contested by seven clubs.

PF Cassano Magnago is the championship's most successful club with eleven titles in a row between 1986 and 1996, while Jomi Salerno has been the most successful team in the 21st century so far with seven titles between 2004 and 2019. Most recently the 2018-19 edition was won by Jomi Salerno. The competition is currently not granted a spot in the Champions League, and instead its champion and runner-up take part in the EHF Cup.

List of champions

 1970  Pareto Roma
 1971  CUS Roma
 1972  Scuola Germanica
 1973  Scuola Germanica
 1974  Montello Roma
 1975  Del Tongo Arezzo
 1976  Lem Roma
 1977  Del Tongo Roma
 1978  Brixen Damen
 1979  Brixen Damen
 1980  Mercury Bologna
 1981  Brixen Damen
 1982  Brixen Damen
 1983  Brixen Damen
 1984  Brixen Damen
 1985  Brixen Damen
 1986  Cassano Magnago
 1987  Cassano Magnago

 1988  Cassano Magnago
 1989  Cassano Magnago
 1990  Cassano Magnago
 1991  Cassano Magnago
 1992  Cassano Magnago
 1993  Cassano Magnago
 1994  Cassano Magnago
 1995  Cassano Magnago
 1996  Cassano Magnago
 1997  Rimini
 1998  Rimini
 1999  De Gasperi Enna
 2000  Eos Ina Siracusa
 2001  Pidigi Dossobuono
 2002  De Gasperi Enna
 2003  Sassari
 2004  Handball Salerno
 2005  Sassari

 2006  Sassari
 2007  Sassari
 2008  Sassari
 2009  Sassari
 2010  HT Salerno
 2011  HT Salerno
 2012  Teramo
 2013  Handball Salerno
 2014  Handball Salerno
 2015  Indeco Conversano
 2016  Indeco Conversano
 2017  Handball Salerno
 2018  Handball Salerno
 2019  Handball Salerno
 2020 Not awarded
 2021  Handball Salerno
 2022  Brixen Damen
 2023

2011-12 teams
  Gruppo Principe
  Messana
  Nuorese
  Roma Futura
  Salerno
  Sassari
  Teramo

References

 

Women's handball leagues
Handball
Women's handball in Italy
Women's sports leagues in Italy